Basmat Watan is a political satire and slapstick programme that airs via the Lebanese Broadcasting Corporation, a privately owned television station in Lebanon. The writer of the show, Charbel Khalil, began work on the program in 1995 and in 2007 was leading its timeslot with 26 percent of the audience. The title of the programme is a pun, as in Lebanese Arabic the title can either refer to either "death" or "smiles" of a nation. Basmat Watan is the longest-running political satire program in Lebanon.

Origins 
In 1995, Basmat Watan started by lampooning Lebanese political figures, including the then Prime Minister of Lebanon Rafic Hariri.

Politics 
Khalil, who is also the producer of the show, says the show does not favor any political party in Lebanon and that "the key is to take on absolutely everyone". One sketch on the show depicted a journalist with a swollen face after an interview with the allegedly quick-tempered Michel Aoun, leader of the Free Patriotic Movement. In an interview with The New York Times, Khalil responded to suggestions that he targeted the Hezbollah ruling party more, saying "I criticize them more because they are the majority in Parliament", adding "if they lose, I will criticize the other side more."

References 

Lebanese comedy
Lebanese television series
Lebanese political satire
1995 Lebanese television series debuts
1990s Lebanese television series
2000s Lebanese television series
2010s Lebanese television series
2020s Lebanese television series
Lebanese Broadcasting Corporation International original programming